Josephson is a patronymic surname meaning "son of Joseph". Notable people with the surname include:

 Andy Josephson (born 1964), American lawyer and politician
 Brian David Josephson (born 1940), Welsh physicist
 Duane Josephson (1942–1997), American baseball player
 Erland Josephson (1923–2012), Swedish actor and author
 Erik Josephson (1864–1929), Swedish architect
 Ernst Josephson (1851–1906), Swedish painter
 Ian Josephson, Canadian judge
 Julien Josephson (1881–1959), American motion picture screenwriter
 Karen Josephson (born 1964), American swimmer
 Les Josephson (1942–2020), American football player
 Mark Josephson (1943–2017), American cardiac electrophysiologist
 Matthew Josephson (1899–1978), American journalist and author
 Samantha Josephson (died 2019), American murder victim
 Sarah Josephson (born 1964), American swimmer
 Timothy Josephson, American politician

See also
 Josephson effect, used in quantum-mechanical circuits, with related terms:
 Josephson energy
 Josephson penetration depth
 Josephson vortex
 Pi Josephson junction
 Josefsson
 Hans Josephsohn (1920–2012), Swiss sculptor

English-language surnames
Patronymic surnames
Surnames from given names